Nathan Williams Sr. (born March 24, 1963) is an American zydeco accordionist, singer and songwriter. He established his band Nathan & the Zydeco Cha Chas in 1985.

Early life 
Williams grew up Catholic in a French Creole-speaking home in St. Martinville, Louisiana, the youngest of seven children. Williams lost his father when he was seven years old.

He developed his musical sensibility in his hometown, a place rich in folk tradition, following in the footsteps of his uncle, the Creole guitarist Harry Hypolite, who was a band member with both Clifton Chenier and later with his son C. J. Chenier. The young Williams eagerly sought out the music of zydeco originators such as Chenier. When he was too young to attend a Chenier dance at a St. Martinville club, he hovered by the window-sized fan at the back of the building to hear his idol, only to have the bill of his baseball cap clipped off by the fan when he leaned too close.

When he was 13, Williams moved to Lafayette, Louisiana to live with his older brother Sid and his wife. He worked in Sid's grocery store. Later, while recovering from a serious illness, Nathan decided to dedicate himself to learning the accordion. He began practicing in the bathroom because he did not want anyone to hear him play. His main mentor was Buckwheat Zydeco, although his biggest influence was Chenier. Sid Williams purchased his brother's first accordion from Buckwheat Zydeco.

Career

Williams began playing professionally around the age of 21. Just five years after graduating from high school, Williams was recording 45s on his brother's El Sid independent record label. Sid opened a club in Lafayette, El-Sid-O's, and Nathan became a regular Friday night performer there.

Williams got his lucky break after Buckwheat Zydeco had left Rounder Records for Island Records. Rounder was in need of an accordionist to fill a spot on a project they had lined up. Buckwheat Zydeco suggested Williams for the position; he auditioned and got the recording contract. In 1985, he formed his band, Nathan & the Zydeco Cha-Chas, with which he plays to this day. Williams named the band after a Chenier instrumental song. In 1988, Williams and the band performed for the first time at the New Orleans Jazz & Heritage Festival.

The Cha Chas played at the New Orleans Rock n' Bowl for the first time in November 1992. After their successful performances as well as those by John Delafose and Beau Jocques, the venue began to host zydeco bands every Thursday night beginning in spring 1993. In 1997, Williams released a live album recorded at the club, titled I'm a Zydeco Hog: Live at the Rock 'N' Bowl, New Orleans. Nathan and the Zydeco Cha Chas performed at the 30th anniversary celebration of the venue in November 2018.

Early in his career, The New York Times wrote that the then-25 year old Williams was "poised to become important; already he is being mentioned as one of the people revitalizing the genre". A few months later, the newspaper described him as "rightly considered one of the best young zydeco musicians in Louisiana".

His musical style combines elements of zydeco, jazz, blues and R&B. Williams writes most of the band's original tunes.

For more than three decades, Nathan & the Zydeco Cha Chas have toured widely, performing at venues as diverse as his brother's convenience store in Lafayette, Louisiana to the Lincoln Center in New York and the Grand Ole Opry in Nashville, Tennessee. The Cha Chas performed at the 1996 Summer Olympics in Atlanta. Internationally, he has performed in Austria, Spain, France, Japan, the Netherlands, Turkey and Germany, among others. They were the first zydeco band to perform in Poland.

From its inception, the band has included members of the Williams family, with Nathan on accordion and lead vocals, older brother Dennis Paul Williams on guitar, first cousin Mark Anthony ("Chukka") Williams on rubboard, and brother Sid as manager. Other Williams family band members have included his son, accordionist and keyboardist Nathan Williams Jr., cousin Allen Williams on bass, nephew Djuan on rubboard and accordion. Non-family band members have included bassists Paul Newman and Wayne Burns, drummers Herman "Rat" Brown and Gerard St. Julien Jr., Clifford Alexander on rubboard, and Allen "Cat Roy" Broussard on saxophones.

On his 1995 album Creole Crossroads, Williams teamed up with Cajun fiddler Michael Doucet from the band BeauSoleil. At the time, collaborations between zydeco and Cajun musicians were rare.

In 2008, Williams played accordion on Buddy Guy's album Skin Deep.

In 2013, he founded his own record label, Cha Cha Records, which releases albums by both Williams Sr. and Williams Jr.

In 2022, Nathan & the Zydeco Cha Chas toured with the Dirty Dozen Brass Band, playing 30 dates across the United States, promoted as the Mardi Gras Mambo Tour.

Nathan & the Zydeco Cha-Chas were nominated for a 2023 Grammy Award in the Best Regional Roots Music Album category, for Lucky Man.

Personal life
When he is not touring, Williams runs a trucking company named Cha Cha Hot Shot Service that hauls equipment for the Louisiana oil and gas industry.

Williams met his future wife Nancy when he was 16 years old. They were high school sweethearts. He said "Once I met her, that was it. I have a nice wife, a nice family. I make a decent living. I enjoy what I'm doing." The couple have three children.

Nathan Williams Jr. began performing with the Cha Chas at age 3, playing the rubboard. He released his debut album Zydeco Ballin'  in 2002, at age 14. Since then, he has led his own band, Lil' Nathan and the Zydeco Big Timers, playing accordion and keyboards.

Williams' youngest son Naylan is also a musician and record producer. He played most of the instruments on his father's 2022 album Lucky Man.

His older brother Dennis Paul Williams, in addition to being a jazz and zydeco guitarist, is a well-known visual artist, whose mixed media works have been exhibited in multiple U.S. cities and in Europe. His paintings were featured in a 2013 book titled Soul Exchange and appear on the covers of two books by poet John Warner Smith.

Discography

Studio and live albums

Singles

Various artist compilation albums

Filmography
 1994: The Kingdom of Zydeco (documentary, directed by Robert Mugge), includes commentary and a performance by Williams
 2009: In the Electric Mist (feature film directed by Bertrand Tavernier), cameo appearance
 2010: Rounder Records 40th Anniversary Concert, aired on PBS, includes a performance by Nathan & the Zydeco Cha Chas

Awards and honors
 2002: Best of the Beat Award for Best Zydeco Band or Performer
 2005: inducted into the Louisiana Music Hall of Fame
 2006: Best of the Beat Award for Best Zydeco Band or Performer 
 2006: Best of the Beat Award, Best Zydeco Album for Hang it High, Hang it Low
 2010: Big Easy Music Award for Best Zydeco Band
 2012: Big Easy Music Award for Best Zydeco Band
 2012: Zydeco Music Association Lifetime Achievement Award
 2015: Zydeco, Blues and Trailride (ZBT) Clifton Chenier Lifetime Achievement Award
 2017: Landry Vineyards in West Monroe, Louisiana unveiled their "Nathan Williams Zydeco Wine" label in honor of the musician who performed at the venue for many years
 2023: Grammy Award nomination in the Best Regional Roots Music Album category, for Lucky Man
 unknown year: voted top festival band in the country

References

External links

 
 
 
 video of Nathan & the Zydeco Cha Chas full set at the Cajun Zydeco Festival in New Orleans, August 23, 2021

1963 births
Living people
American accordionists
20th-century African-American male singers
People from St. Martinville, Louisiana
Singers from Louisiana
Zydeco accordionists
20th-century accordionists
21st-century accordionists
20th-century American male musicians
21st-century American male musicians
20th-century African-American musicians
21st-century African-American musicians
African-American Catholics
Rounder Records artists
Maison de Soul Records artists